Sports Entertainment Group (SEG) (formerly Pacific Star Network) is an Australian sports media content and entertainment business. SEG is the owner and parent company of Sports Entertainment Network (SEN).

In December 2014, Pacific Star Network acquired Morrison Media Services, the publisher of Frankie Magazine and Smith Journal. They sold Morrison Media Services to Nextmedia in September 2018.

In January 2018, Pacific Star Network acquired 100 per cent of equity in Crocmedia. In September 2020, Pacific Star Network rebranded Crocmedia as Sports Entertainment Network. Two months later, Pacific Star Network changed its name to Sports Entertainment Group.

Under Pacific Star Network and Crocmedia, the company owned 25 percent of National Basketball League (NBL) team Melbourne United between 2018 and 2021. In July 2021, under chairman Craig Coleman and CEO Craig Hutchison, SEG purchased rival NBL team the Perth Wildcats from previous owner Jack Bendat. In November 2021, SEG's New Zealand subsidiary purchased New Zealand National Basketball League (NZNBL) team the Otago Nuggets. In April 2022, SEN purchased Women's National Basketball League (WNBL) team the Bendigo Spirit.

Assets
 BallPark Entertainment
 Bravo Management
 Precision Sports Entertainment Group
 Sports Entertainment Network
 AFL Record
 6EL
 1116 SEN
 693 SENQ
 SEN SA
 SEN Track
 Sports Entertainment Network New Zealand (SENZ)
 Rainmaker / Rapid TV

References

External links

 
Companies listed on the Australian Securities Exchange
Australian radio networks
Magazine publishing companies of Australia
Australian companies established in 2001
Publishing companies established in 2001
Mass media in Melbourne